Sala Nanyanzi Senkayi is an African environmental scientist at the United States Environmental Protection Agency. She was the first Ugandan-born woman to win the Presidential Early Career Award for Scientists and Engineers.

Early life and education 
Senkayi is the daughter of Abu Senkayi and Sunajeh Senkayi. Her family are from Butambala District in Uganda. Her father was an environmental scientist and worked at Texas A&M University as a research scientist from 1977.

Senkayi obtained a bachelor’s degree in biomedical sciences from Texas A&M University in College Station, Texas. She joined the University of Texas at Arlington, earning two more Bachelor's degrees in microbiology and biology.  Later, she earned a master's degree (2010) and a PhD (2012) degrees in environmental and earth sciences from the same university. Her PhD thesis considered the association between childhood leukaemia and proximity to airports in Texas. She found that benzene emissions were a predictor for childhood leukaemia. During her graduate studies Muwenda Mutebi II of Buganda and Sylvia Nnaginda visited her in Texas.

Career 
Senkayi joined the United States Environmental Protection Agency in 2007. She works with local children in schools and colleges talking about the environment. She initiated the EPA Converses with Students webcast, an opportunity for children to speak to scientists who worked on environmental protection on Earth Day. Her research focuses on water quality protection and she is the Water Quality Division Quality Assurance Officer. In 2017 Senkayi was awarded the Presidential Early Career Award for Scientists and Engineers for her "transformative" community outreach and research.

References

Texas A&M University alumni
University of Texas at Arlington alumni
Environmental scientists
21st-century Ugandan women scientists
21st-century Ugandan scientists
Year of birth missing (living people)
Living people